A partial lunar eclipse took place on Tuesday, June 4, 1974, the first of two lunar eclipses in 1974. The Moon was strikingly shadowed in this deep partial eclipse which lasted 3 hours, 13 minutes and 37.1 seconds, with 82.695% of the Moon in darkness at maximum. The Moon was 4.5 days before apogee (Apogee on Sunday, June 9, 1974), making it 4.4% smaller than average.

Visibility 
It was completely visible over South America, Europe, Africa, central Asia, Australia, seen rising over North Altantic Ocean and South America, and setting over Asia and west in Australia.

Related lunar eclipses

Saros series 
It was part of Saros series 120.

Half-Saros cycle
A lunar eclipse will be preceded and followed by solar eclipses by 9 years and 5.5 days (a half saros). This lunar eclipse is related to two total solar eclipses of Solar Saros 127.

Eclipses in 1974 
 A partial lunar eclipse on Tuesday, 4 June 1974.
 A total solar eclipse on Thursday, 20 June 1974.
 A total lunar eclipse on Friday, 29 November 1974.
 A partial solar eclipse on Friday, 13 December 1974.

Lunar year series

Tritos series 
 Preceded: Lunar eclipse of July 7, 1963
 Followed: Lunar eclipse of May 4, 1985

Tzolkinex 
 Preceded: Lunar eclipse of April 24, 1967
 Followed: Lunar eclipse of July 17, 1981

See also 
List of lunar eclipses
List of 20th-century lunar eclipses

Notes

External links 
 

1974-06
1974 in science
June 1974 events